Panicum frumentaceum can refer to:

 Panicum frumentaceum Roxb., a synonym of Echinochloa frumentacea
 Panicum frumentaceum Salisb., a synonym of Sorghum bicolor